Nong Muang is a district (amphoe) in the northern part of Lopburi province, central Thailand.

History
Following a suggestion issued in 1989, six tambons were separated from Khok Samrong district to form the new minor district (king amphoe) Nong Muang on 1 April 1990. The minor district was upgraded to full district status on 5 December 1996.

Geography
Neighboring districts are (from the northeast clockwise) Khok Charoen, Sa Bot, Khok Samrong, Ban Mi, and the districts Takhli, Tak Fa and Phaisali of Nakhon Sawan province.

Administration
The district is divided into six sub-districts (tambons), which are further subdivided into 67 villages (mubans). Nong Muang itself has township (thesaban tambon) status and covers part of the tambon Nong Muang. There are six tambon administrative organizations (TAO).

References

External links
amphoe.com

Nong Muang